Da'ira is a populated place in the southeast of the island of Socotra in Yemen.

References

Populated places in Socotra
Socotra Governorate